Wei Suowei (born 20 May 2005) is a Chinese footballer currently playing as a defender for Guangzhou.

Club career
Born in Chongzuo, Guangxi, Wei and his twin brother, Zixian, joined Guangzhou in 2016. In making his debut for Guangzhou, he became the first person from Chongzuo to play in the Chinese Super League.

Career statistics

Club
.

Notes

References

2005 births
Living people
People from Chongzuo
Footballers from Guangxi
Chinese footballers
Association football defenders
Chinese Super League players
Guangzhou F.C. players